Kosmos 202 ( meaning Cosmos 202), also known as DS-U2-V No.4, was a Soviet satellite which was launched in 1968 as part of the Dnepropetrovsk Sputnik programme. It was a  spacecraft, which was built by the Yuzhnoye Design Office, and was used to conduct classified technology development experiments for the Soviet armed forces.

A Kosmos-2I 63SM carrier rocket was used to launch Kosmos 202 into low Earth orbit. The launch took place from Site 86/4 at Kapustin Yar. The launch occurred at 10:03:11 GMT on 20 February 1968, and resulted in the successful insertion of the satellite into orbit. Upon reaching orbit, the satellite was assigned its Kosmos designation, and received the International Designator 1968-010A. The North American Air Defense Command assigned it the catalogue number 03128.

Kosmos 202 was the last of four DS-U2-V satellites to be launched. On 24 March 1968, it decayed from orbit and reentered the atmosphere.

See also

 1968 in spaceflight

References

Spacecraft launched in 1968
Kosmos satellites
Dnepropetrovsk Sputnik program